Vladimir Valeryevich Leonchenko (born 11 April 1972) is a Russian professional football executive and a former player. He works as the general director (CEO) of FC Lokomotiv Moscow.

Playing career
He made his professional debut in the Russian Second Division in 1992 for FC Dynamo-d Moscow.

Post-playing career
He headed the Russian Professional Football Players and Coaches Union.

Honours
 Russian Premier League bronze: 1994.

European club competitions
 UEFA Cup 1996–97 with FC Torpedo-Luzhniki Moscow: 4 games, 1 own goal.
 UEFA Intertoto Cup 1998 with FC Shinnik Yaroslavl: 4 games, 1 goal.
 UEFA Cup 2000–01 with FC Torpedo Moscow: 1 game.
 UEFA Cup 2001–02 with FC Torpedo Moscow: 2 games.
 UEFA Cup 2003–04 with FC Torpedo Moscow: 5 games, 1 goal.

References

1972 births
Footballers from Moscow
Living people
Russian people of Ukrainian descent
Russian footballers
FC Dynamo Moscow reserves players
FC Rostov players
Russian Premier League players
FC Lokomotiv Moscow players
FC Torpedo Moscow players
FC Torpedo-2 players
FC Shinnik Yaroslavl players
FC Amkar Perm players
FC Spartak Vladikavkaz players
FC Akhmat Grozny players
Association football midfielders
Association football defenders